Pero morrisonaria, or Morrison's pero, is a moth of the family Geometridae. The species was first described by Henry Edwards in 1881. It is found from Newfoundland to British Columbia, and coast to coast in the northern United States, south in the east to South Carolina, south in the west to California.

The wingspan is 34–40 mm. The moth flies from May to July depending on the location.

The larvae feed on Abies balsamea and other firs, like Pseudotsuga menziesii, hemlock, pine, spruce and tamarack. Furthermore, they have been reported on broad-leaved trees and shrubs such as alder, birch, buffaloberry, meadowsweet, poplar and willow.

References

Azelinini
Moths of North America
Moths described in 1881